Brett Allen (born 14 April 1966) is a retired Australian rules football Field umpire in the Australian Football League. He  umpired 346 career games in the AFL since his debut in 1992.

A veteran of the AFL umpiring list, Allen was involved in the "Whispers in the Sky" controversy. Although not accused of doing anything improper, he was the second umpire, along with Matthew Head, on the flight. He defended Head, saying "Head had made no such comment". Two police officers were appointed to investigate the alleged comments by the umpires, however found nothing regarding the accused bribery.

He is fifth on the AFL Umpiring all-time records for the number of finals games officiated, with 33, which is one behind fellow 2007-listed umpire Darren Goldspink.
He has also won the All Australian Umpire of the year four times over his AFL career: in 1999, 2000, 2002 and 2006.

He announced his retirement on 5 September 2007, citing the increase in interstate travel and training required to umpire at the highest level.

He was inducted into the Australian Football Hall of Fame in 2017.  On 24 October 2000, Allen was awarded the Australian Sports Medal for his contribution to the game.

Footnotes

1966 births
Australian Football League umpires
Living people
Recipients of the Australian Sports Medal
Australian Football Hall of Fame inductees